Boonville is a city in Boon Township, Warrick County, Indiana, United States. The population was 6,246 at the 2010 census. The city is the county seat of Warrick County.

History
Boonville was founded in 1818 and named for Jesse Boon, father of Ratliff Boon. A post office has been in operation at Boonville since 1820. Boonville was incorporated in 1858.

President Abraham Lincoln studied law in Boonville. When Abraham Lincoln and his family moved from Kentucky to present-day Spencer County in 1816, their homestead was then considered to be within Boonville's Warrick County boundaries. The future president frequently walked to Boonville to borrow books and watch local attorney John Brackenridge argue cases, thus earning Boonville the distinction of being "where Lincoln learned the law."

Points of interest
The Boonville post office contains a casein tempera-on-canvas mural titled Boonville Beginnings, painted in 1941 by Ida Abelman. Murals were produced from 1934 to 1943 in the United States through the Section of Painting and Sculpture, later called the Section of Fine Arts, of the Treasury Department.

The Boonville Public Square Historic District and Old Warrick County Jail are listed on the National Register of Historic Places.

WBNL is an AM/FM (1540 AM, 99.9 FM) radio station operated in Boonville. Owned by Ralph Turpin, WBNL has been on air for decades. WBNL has broadcast sporting events for not only Boonville High School, but also Tecumseh High School. Most livestreams are hosted by BHS Teacher Jim Little, and he is usually accompanied by Rick Madden, Jay Miller, Allen Buck, or Tom Presley.

Geography
Boonville is located at  (38.046231, -87.272544).

Climate
The climate in this area is characterized by hot, humid summers and generally mild to cool winters.  According to the Köppen Climate Classification system, Boonville has a humid subtropical climate, abbreviated "Cfa" on climate maps.

Demographics

2010 census
As of the 2010 census, there were 6,246 people, 2,549 households, and 1,647 families living in the city. The racial makeup of the city was 97.7% White, 0.5% African American, 0.2% Native American, 0.1% Asian, 0.4% from other races, and 1.1% from two or more races. Hispanic or Latino of any race were 1.2% of the population.

There were 2,549 households, of which 31.3% had children under the age of 18 living with them, 47.0% were married couples living together, 13.5% had a female householder with no husband present, 4.1% had a male householder with no wife present, and 35.4% were non-families. 31.1% of all households were made up of individuals, and 15.1% had someone living alone who was 65 years of age or older. The average household size was 2.39 and the average family size was 2.97.

The median age in the city was 39.4 years. 23.3% of residents were under the age of 18; 7.4% were between the ages of 18 and 24; 25.8% were from 25 to 44; 25.4% were from 45 to 64; and 18% were 65 years of age or older. The gender makeup of the city was 46.3% male and 53.7% female.

2000 census
As of the 2000 census, there were 6,834 people, 2,688 households, and 1,854 families living in the city. The racial makeup of the city was 98.51% White, 0.64% African American, 0.20% Native American, 0.12% Asian, 0.01% Pacific Islander, 0.03% from other races, and 0.48% from two or more races. Hispanic or Latino of any race were 0.44% of the population.

There were 2,688 households, out of which 32.1% had children under the age of 18 living with them, 52.2% were married couples living together, 12.4% had a female householder with no husband present, and 31.0% were non-families. 27.8% of all households were made up of individuals, and 14.7% had someone living alone who was 65 years of age or older. The average household size was 2.45 and the average family size was 2.98.

In the city, the population was spread out, with 25.2% under the age of 18, 9.3% from 18 to 24, 28.2% from 25 to 44, 21.4% from 45 to 64, and 15.9% who were 65 years of age or older. The median age was 37 years. For every 100 females, there were 90.7 males. For every 100 females age 18 and over, there were 84.9 males.

The median income for a household in the city was $34,913, and the median income for a family was $42,096. Males had a median income of $32,264 versus $22,227 for females. The per capita income for the city was $15,869. About 6.5% of families and 9.2% of the population were below the poverty line, including 14.1% of those under age 18 and 7.3% of those age 65 or over.

Government
The government consists of a mayor and a city council. The mayor is elected in citywide vote. The city council consists of five members. Four are elected from individual districts. One is elected at-large.

Transportation
The Boonville Airport is located two nautical miles (2.3 mi, 3.7 km) west of the central business district. Boonville also has the Warrick Area Transit System (WATS), a public bus line which connects with the nearby Metropolitan Evansville Transit System (METS).

Education
The town has a lending library, the Boonville-Warrick County Public Library.

Notable people 
 Louis A. Arnold – HVAC worker and Socialist Party of America Wisconsin State Senator
 Benoni S. Fuller – schoolteacher, sheriff, and Democratic state legislator and Congressman
 Barbara Maier Gustern - singer and vocal coach
 James A. Hemenway - lawyer, US Representative, US Senator
 Monte M. Katterjohn – screenwriter for 68 films between 1912 and 1931
 Menz Lindsey – lawyer who was also a quarterback in the early National Football League for the Evansville Crimson Giants
 Philip Lutz, Jr. – 27th Indiana Attorney General (1933-37)
 W. Otto Miessner – composer and music educator
 Ken Penner – baseball pitcher who played Major League Baseball for two seasons (1916 and 1929) between decades of a minor league career that lasted through 1943
 Dustin Ransom – musician, producer, vocalist, arranger, music transcriber, and film composer
 Rachel Rockwell – theatre director, choreographer, dancer and actor
 Robert G. Roeder - Professor at The Rockefeller University, pioneer scientist in eukaryotic transcription
 Jeremy Spencer – musician, songwriter and record producer, co-founder and drummer for heavy metal band Five Finger Death Punch
 Travis Williams – tailback in the National Football League's Evansville Crimson Giants

References

External links
 City website

 
Cities in Indiana
Cities in Warrick County, Indiana
County seats in Indiana
Evansville metropolitan area
Communities of Southwestern Indiana